Lome is a dispersed settlement in the hills southeast of Črni Vrh in the Municipality of Idrija in the traditional Inner Carniola region of Slovenia.

The village includes the hamlets of Cigale, Dolnje Lome, Gornje Lome, Grižar, Na Griču, Na Ravni, Oblak, Podjesen, and Zakrog.

The Javornik ski slope is located at Lome.

Notable people
Notable people that were born or lived in Lome include:
 Matej Cigale (1819–1889), linguist and editor
 Ivan Tominec (1890–1965), linguist

References

External links
Lome on Geopedia

Populated places in the Municipality of Idrija

sl:Lome